The Essential 1927 is a greatest hits album by the Australian pop rock band, 1927. It was released in June 2013 and peaked at number 94.
The album contains 5 ARIA Chart top 20 singles  spanning the band's entire career. Tracks 15 & 16 are listed as "bonus tracks" and released on the band's fourth studio album Generation-i a month later.

Track listing
 "That's When I Think of You" - 4:09
 "To Love Me"  - 4:20
 "The Other Side" - 4:13
 "A World Without You" - 3:18 	
 "Scars"	- 3:44
 "Tell Me A Story" - 4:10
 "Compulsory Hero" - 4:35
 "If I Could" - 3:39
 "Don't Forget Me" - 4:38
 "You'll Never Know"	- 3:39
 "It Ain't Love" - 4:20
 "Give The Kid A Break"	- 3:37
 "Propaganda Machine"	- 3:23
 "The Mess" - 2:42
 "Story Never Ends" - 5:29
 "Where You Are" - 4:26

Charts

Release history

References

2013 greatest hits albums
1927 (band) albums
Albums produced by Charles Fisher (producer)
Compilation albums by Australian artists
Sony Music Australia compilation albums
Warner Music Group compilation albums